The following are the matches played by the Tanzania national football team since its debut in 1945.

1960s

1969

1970s

1970

1972

1973

1974

1975

1976

1977

1979

1980s

1980

1981

1982

1983

1984

1985

1986

1987

1988

1989

1990s

1990

1991

1994

1995

1996

1997

1999

2000s

2000

2001

2002

2004

2005

2006

2007

2008

2010s

2010

2011

2012

2013

2015

2016

2017

2018

2019

2020

2021

2022

2023

Notes

References 

Tanzania national football team